Abraham Lincoln: Vampire Hunter is a biographical action horror mashup novel by Seth Grahame-Smith, released on March 2, 2010, through New York–based publishing company Grand Central Publishing.

Plot summary
The journal-style book is written as a partial "secret" diary of Abraham Lincoln, kept by the 16th President of the United States and given to the author by a vampire named Henry Sturges. Years later, the manuscript is found in a five-and-dime store in the town of Rhinebeck, New York (a reference to Smith's wife's hometown).

When Abraham Lincoln is only eleven years old, he learns from his father Thomas that vampires are, in fact, real. Thomas explains to his son that a vampire killed Abraham's grandfather (also named Abraham Lincoln) in 1786. Young Abraham is also shocked to learn that his beloved mother, Nancy, succumbed not to milk sickness but rather to being given a "fool's dose" of vampire blood, the result of Thomas's failure to repay a debt. Lincoln vows in his diary to kill as many vampires as he can. A year later, he lures the vampire responsible for his mother's death to the family farm and manages to kill it with a homemade stake.

In 1825, Lincoln gets word of a possible vampire attack along the Ohio River and investigates, but this time he is no match for the vampire and is nearly killed. He is saved at the last moment by the intervention of the vampire Henry Sturges. Henry nurses Lincoln back to health and explains some of the nature of vampirism, emphasizing that some vampires are good, such as he, and others are evil. Lincoln spends the summer with Henry sharpening his senses and being trained as an expert vampire hunter. Henry sends Lincoln the names and addresses of evil vampires; Abraham dutifully tracks them down and kills them.

As a young adult, Lincoln and a friend travel down the Mississippi River to New Orleans on a flatboat to sell a number of goods. Here, Lincoln's life is changed forever after he witnesses a slave auction. Lincoln follows a slave buyer and his new slaves back to their plantation and discovers to his horror that the buyer is a vampire; the slaves are to be used not for labor but for food. Lincoln writes in his journal his belief that vampires will continue to exist in America as long as they can easily buy their victims in this manner; to end slavery is to end the scourge of vampires. Lincoln becomes an abolitionist. Lincoln returns to his home in New Salem and begins his business and political careers by day, continuing to track down the vampires in Henry's letters at night. His life is once again tinged by tragedy when his fiancée Ann Rutledge is attacked and murdered by her ex-fiancé John McNamar, now a vampire living in New York City. With Henry's help, Lincoln catches McNamar and kills him, but he decides to give up vampire hunting and instead concentrate on his daytime pursuits. Lincoln marries Mary Todd, begins to raise a family, starts a law firm and is elected to a term in the U.S. House of Representatives.

While in Washington, Lincoln meets his old friend Edgar Allan Poe, who also knows the truth about vampires. Poe tells Lincoln that the vampires are being chased out of their ancestral homes in Europe (in part because of a public outcry over the bloody atrocities of Elizabeth Báthory) and are flocking to America because of the slave trade. Poe warns that if the vampires are left unchecked, they will eventually seek to enslave all Americans, white and black. Lincoln leaves Washington in 1849 and declines to seek re-election; Poe is found murdered that same year in Baltimore, the victim of a vampire attack. In 1857, Henry summons Lincoln to New York City. Here, Lincoln and fellow vampire slayer William Seward are told that the vampires in the South intend to start a civil war so that they can conquer the north and enslave all humans of America. Lincoln runs for the U.S. Senate and debates Stephen A. Douglas in what became known as the Lincoln–Douglas debates. Although Lincoln loses to Douglas (an ally of the Southern vampires), he gains a great deal of publicity and respect, which allows him to capture the Republican Party nomination for President of the United States and then the office itself.

Lincoln's 1860 presidential election triggers the secession of the southern slave states and the start of the American Civil War. His former opponent Douglas also sides with him, regretting his previous alliance with vampires. Early battles, such as the First Battle of Bull Run, go poorly for the Union troops after they are attacked by Confederate vampires. Lincoln decides that the best way to defeat the vampires is to eliminate their food source and starve them out; to that end, he announces the Emancipation Proclamation and encourages the slaves to fight back against slave owners and vampires alike. This begins to turn the tide of the war. However, the war takes a personal toll on Lincoln. A vampire assassin sneaks onto the White House lawn and kills Lincoln's son, Willie. Henry appears at the White House and offers to turn Willie into a vampire so that he will "live" again, but Lincoln is unwilling to allow it, despite being very tempted. Enraged, he banishes Henry and all other vampires from the White House and refuses to speak to any of them ever again.

The Civil War ends with the Confederacy's defeat. Lincoln receives reports that the vampires in the South are fleeing to Asia and South America in the wake of the slave system's collapse. Happy for the first time in many years, he attends a play at Ford's Theater, only to be assassinated by actor John Wilkes Booth. Booth expects the vampires to rally around Lincoln's death but instead finds himself shunned and hiding in a Virginia barn as Union troops arrive to arrest him. Henry arrives and confronts Booth inside the burning barn, killing him. After Booth is killed, Lincoln's body is brought by a funeral train back to Springfield, Illinois, where Henry stands guard.

98 years later, during Martin Luther King Jr.'s famous "I Have a Dream" speech at the Lincoln Memorial in 1963, both Lincoln and Henry attend and Lincoln writes about spending the previous night at the White House as a guest of then-current president John F. Kennedy (and how the monument dedicated to him gives him "no shortage of discomfort"). Henry had used his powers to turn Lincoln into a vampire, believing that "some men are just too interesting to die".

Reception
The Los Angeles Times gave Abraham Lincoln, Vampire Hunter a positive review, noting that "a writer who can transform the greatest figure from 19th-century American history into the star of an original vampire tale with humor, heart and bite is a rare find indeed".

Time magazine gave the novel a mixed review, calling author Grahame-Smith "a lively, fluent writer with a sharp sense of tone and pace", but finding the novel "a little too neat" and noting that "once the connection is made, it feels obvious, and neither slavery nor vampirism reveals anything in particular about the other. One could imagine a richer, subtler treatment of the subject, in which the two horrors multiply each other rather than cancel each other out".

Film adaptation

20th Century Fox produced a film adaptation, released June 22, 2012. Timur Bekmambetov directed the film, Tim Burton produced along with Bekmambetov and Jim Lemley, and Benjamin Walker starred as Abraham Lincoln.

Sequel 
A sequel, titled The Last American Vampire and focusing on Henry Sturges's experiences during many major events of the 20th century, was released on January 13, 2015.

See also
 Mashup novel
 The Amazing Screw-On Head,  a comic book and cartoon involving Abraham Lincoln and vampires

References

2010 American novels
Parody novels
Fictional depictions of Abraham Lincoln in literature
American horror novels
American comedy novels
American vampire novels
American novels adapted into films
Works published under a pseudonym
Cultural depictions of Edgar Allan Poe
Cultural depictions of Elizabeth Báthory
American Civil War alternate histories
Epistolary novels
Novels about revenge
White House in fiction
Novels by Seth Grahame-Smith
Grand Central Publishing books